First Lady of the Republic of Cameroon refers to the wife of the president of Cameroon. Chantal Biya, the second wife of President Paul Biya, became First Lady upon her marriage to Biya on April 23, 1994.

First ladies of Cameroon

Notes

References

Presidents of Cameroon
Politics of Cameroon
Cameroon
Cameroon politics-related lists